Daniel Mirl Gare (born May 14, 1954) is a Canadian broadcaster, ice hockey coach and former National Hockey League (NHL) player, most notably of the Buffalo Sabres. During a 13-year professional career, Gare also played for the Detroit Red Wings and Edmonton Oilers.  He was a two-time All-Star right winger who twice scored 50 goals in a season for the Sabres.  He was known for his quick wrist shot and status as a small, yet scrappy and fearless player.

Playing career
Gare played for the WCJHL's Calgary Centennials from 1971 to 1974. In his final season with the team, he had 127 points. Gare was selected by the Buffalo Sabres with the 29th pick of the 1974 NHL amateur draft. 

Gare, who wore #18, scored his first career NHL goal just 18 seconds into his first regular season game helping the Sabres defeat the Boston Bruins, 9-5, on October 10, 1974. 

In his rookie season of 1974-75, he had 62 points in the regular season and 13 points in the playoffs, as Buffalo went to the Stanley Cup finals. The following year, Gare had 50 goals and 73 points. He had 77 points in 1977-78. In 1979-80, he tied for the league lead with 56 goals and had a career-high 89 points. He then had 85 points the following season. 

Because of his goal scoring prowess he played right wing on the power play even during The French Connection years, which pushed René Robert back to the point. He holds team records for most goals by a right winger (267), most game-tying goals (21), and fastest goal scored from start of NHL career (0:18 into his debut versus the Boston Bruins on 10 October 1974).

On December 2, 1981, Gare, along with Jim Schoenfeld and Derek Smith were traded to the Detroit Red Wings in exchange for Mike Foligno, Dale McCourt and Brent Peterson. Sabres goalie Bob Sauve was dealt to the Red Wings in a separate transaction. Gare finished his career with the Edmonton Oilers in 1986-87.

Gare served as the Sabres captain from the 1977-78 season through his trade to Detroit. He was the Red Wings captain for four seasons from 1982 through 1986.

Post-career
Following his playing career, Gare was briefly an assistant coach and TV color analyst for the Tampa Bay Lightning, and served on the Buffalo Sabres broadcast team on Empire Sports Network. He served as color analyst for the Columbus Blue Jackets under FSN Ohio from 2006 until April 2009. He also served as an interim studio analyst for the Sabres when Mike Robitaille has been unavailable and did color commentary for games that Harry Neale was unable to work. He was appointed the alternate Sabres color analyst and paired with Kevin Sylvester in an effort to reduce the workload of longtime Sabres broadcaster Rick Jeanneret.

Gare was inducted into the Buffalo Sabres Hall of Fame in 1994. On November 22, 2005, Gare had his number 18 jersey retired by the Sabres. He is the fifth player of seven total so honored.

Achievements and awards
WCHL All-Star Team (1974)
NHL Second All-Star Team (1980)
NHL All-Star Game (1980, 1981)

Career statistics

Regular season and playoffs

International

References

External links

1954 births
Living people
Buffalo Sabres announcers
Buffalo Sabres captains
Buffalo Sabres draft picks
Buffalo Sabres players
Calgary Centennials players
Canadian ice hockey forwards
Detroit Red Wings captains
Detroit Red Wings players
Edmonton Oilers players
Ice hockey people from British Columbia
National Hockey League players with retired numbers
People from Nelson, British Columbia
Tampa Bay Lightning announcers
Tampa Bay Lightning coaches
Winnipeg Jets (WHA) draft picks
Canadian ice hockey coaches